Elias Valtonen (born June 11, 1999) is a Finnish professional basketball player for Baxi Manresa of the Liga ACB. He played college basketball for the Arizona State Sun Devils. Valtonen is 2.01 m (6 ft 7 in) tall, and plays the shooting guard position.

Early life and career
Valtonen made his debut for Korihait in Finnish top league Korisliiga in February 2014, at the age of 14. He played five games in total during his rookie season, while the team finished last and was relegated. In the summer of 2015, Valtonen moved to Helsinki to play in the highly regarded academy team HBA-Märsky, coached by former NBA player Hanno Möttölä.

Valtonen was invited to the Jordan Brand Classic Camp in 2015. He has been recruited by several American colleges, including Illinois, Arizona State, Arizona and Utah. On October 13, 2017, Valtonen announced that he'd commit to Arizona State after his current season in Finland was finished with.

College career
Valtonen played collegiately at Arizona State for two seasons. He scored a career-high 10 points in a win over St. John's on November 23, 2019. He averaged 2.0 points per game as a sophomore. On March 17, 2020, Valtonen announced he was leaving Arizona State.

Professional career
On June 19, 2020, Valtonen signed with Tigers Tübingen of the ProA.

On May 28, 2021, he has signed with Baxi Manresa of the Liga ACB.

Career statistics

College

|-
| style="text-align:left;"| 2018–19
| style="text-align:left;"| Arizona State
| 21 || 0 || 3.7 || .556 || .500 || 1.000 || .4 || .1 || .1 || .2 || .8
|-
| style="text-align:left;"| 2019–20
| style="text-align:left;"| Arizona State
| 19 || 8 || 14.3 || .375 || .500 || .467 || 1.8 || .4 || .5 || .1 || 2.0
|- class="sortbottom"
| style="text-align:center;" colspan="2"| Career
| 40 || 8 || 8.7 || .415 || .500 || .529 || 1.1 || .2 || .3 || .2 || 1.4

References

External links
Arizona State Sun Devis bio

1999 births
Living people
Arizona State Sun Devils men's basketball players
Bàsquet Manresa players
Finnish expatriate basketball people in the United States
Finnish expatriate basketball people in Germany
Finnish expatriate basketball people in Spain
Finnish men's basketball players
Liga ACB players
Shooting guards
Sportspeople from Helsinki
Tigers Tübingen players